Treponema is a genus of spiral-shaped bacteria. The major treponeme species of human pathogens is Treponema pallidum, whose subspecies are responsible for diseases such as syphilis, bejel, and yaws.  Treponema carateum is the cause of pinta. Treponema paraluiscuniculi is associated with syphilis in rabbits. Treponema succinifaciens has been found in the gut microbiome of traditional rural human populations.

Phylogeny
The currently accepted taxonomy is based on the List of Prokaryotic names with Standing in Nomenclature (LPSN) and National Center for Biotechnology Information (NCBI).

Unassigned species:
 Treponema calligyrum Noguchi 1913
 Treponema carateum Brumpt 1939 (pinta-causing Treponema)
 "Ca. Treponema faecavium" Gilroy et al. 2021
 Treponema paraluisleporis Lumeij et al. 1994
 Treponema paraluiscuniculi ♦ (Jacobsthal 1920) Smibert 1974
 Treponema pertenue ♦ (Castellani 1905) Castellani & Chalmers 1910
 "Ca. Treponema suis" Molbak et al. 2006
 Treponema refringens (Schaudinn and Hofmann 1905) Castellani and Chalmers
 "Treponema scoliodonta" (Hoffmann 1920) Noguchi 1928 ex Smibert 1984
 "Ca. Treponema teratonymphae" Noda et al. 2018

Notes:
♦ Type strain lost or not available

The species Treponema hyodysenteriae and Treponema innocens have been reclassified into Serpulina hyodysenteriae and Serpulina innocens.

See also
 List of bacteria genera
 List of bacterial orders

References

 
Bacteria genera